Ashley is a civil parish in Cheshire East, England. It contains 16 buildings that are recorded in the National Heritage List for England as designated listed buildings, all of which are at Grade II. This grade is the lowest of the three gradings given to listed buildings and is applied to "buildings of national importance and special interest". Apart from the village of Ashley, the parish is entirely rural. Other than a church and a bridge, the listed buildings are houses, structures related to houses, and farm buildings.

See also
Listed buildings in Altrincham
Listed buildings in Hale
Listed buildings in Mobberley
Listed buildings in Ringway, Manchester
Listed buildings in Rostherne
Listed buildings in Tatton

References
Citations

Sources

 

Listed buildings in the Borough of Cheshire East
Lists of listed buildings in Cheshire